Ulapane is a village in Sri Lanka. It is located within Central Province.

Notable people
Kamala Wijeratne - English language poet

References

External links

Populated places in Kandy District